was a Japanese astronomer and co-discover of 4200 Shizukagozen, an asteroid of the main-belt.

Banno is considered to be one of Japan's pioneering amateur astronomer. He died in a traffic accident in 1991. The main-belt asteroid 3394 Banno was named in his memory on 10 November 1992.

References 
 

1952 births
1991 deaths
20th-century Japanese astronomers
Discoverers of asteroids

Road incident deaths in Japan